Manoj Bhawuk (born 2 January 1976) is an Indian poet writing in Bhojpuri, actor, television presenter and screenwriter, active in Bhojpuri cinema. He has written books. He promotes Bhojpuri language and literature. Bhawuk has been the Project Head of Zee TV's  reality show Sa Re Ga Ma Pa. He is a diploma holder in theatre acting and has acted in TV shows, films and serials. He has been awarded national and international honors.

Career
Bhawuk studied engineering at the Central Institute of Plastics Engineering and Technology and worked as an engineer for a time. He was later a journalist with Doordarshan.

He received the Bharatiya Bhasha Parishad Award in 2006 for his ghazal collection Tasveer zindagi ke.

In 2017 he began to work with Anjan TV and Mahua Plus.

Bhawuk was conferred with the Geetanjali Sahitya Award on 1 September 2018 in Birmingham, United Kingdom by Gitanjali Multilingual Literary Circle, UK for his work and contribution to Bhojpuri Literature. He received the Lokbhasha Samman (लोकभाषा सम्मान) for his innumerous contributions in Bhojpuri literature by Kailash Gautam Srijan Sansthan, constituted in memory of popular poet Kailash Gautam.
Manoj Bhawuk is also chief editor of e-magazines named Bhojpuria and Bhojpuri Junction. He is the director of Achievers Junction dedicated to the legends of the world.

Awards
 Won the Bharatiya Bhasha Parishad Award 2006 by Gulzar and Girija Devi for the book for Tasveer Zindagi Ke
 Won the International Bhojpuri Gaurav Samman, Mauritius 2014 by Sir Anerood Jugnauth, the Prime Minister of Mauritius
 Received the Parikalpana Lok Bhushan Samman in Kathmandu, Nepal (First time this award was given for Bhojpuri literature) in 2013
 Geetanjali Sahitya Award on 1 September 2018 in Birmingham, United Kingdom by Gitanjali Multilingual Literary Circle, UK for his work and contribution to Bhojpuri Literature.
 Kailash Gautam Kavya-Kunth Lokbhasha Samman on 27 December 2022 by Kailash Gautam Srijan Sansthan

References

External links
 

1976 births
Living people
Indian television presenters
Male actors from Bihar
People from Siwan district
People from Bihar
Indian male poets
Poets from Bihar
21st-century Indian poets